A superstructure is an upward extension of an existing structure above a baseline. This term is applied to various kinds of physical structures such as buildings, bridges, or ships.

Aboard ships and large boats
On water craft, the superstructure consists of the parts of the ship or a boat, including sailboats, fishing boats, passenger ships, and submarines, that project above her main deck. This does not usually include its masts or any armament turrets. Note that in modern times, turrets do not always carry naval artillery, but they can also carry missile launchers and/or antisubmarine warfare weapons.

The size of a watercraft's superstructure can have many implications in the performance of ships and boats, since these structures can alter their structural rigidity, their displacements, and/or stability. These can be detrimental to any vessel's performance if they are taken into consideration incorrectly.

The height and the weight of superstructure on board a ship or a boat also affects the amount of freeboard that such a vessel requires along its sides, down to her waterline. In broad terms, the more and heavier superstructure that a ship possesses (as a fraction of her length), the less the freeboard that is needed.

Bridges
On a bridge, the portion of the structure that is the span and directly receives the live load is referred to as the superstructure.  In contrast, the abutment, piers, and other support structures are  called  the 'substructure'.

Earthquake protection

In order to improve the response during earthquakes of buildings and bridges, the superstructure might be separated from its foundation by various civil engineering mechanisms or machinery. All together, these implement the system of earthquake protection called base isolation.

References

External links

Building engineering
Ship compartments
Shipbuilding
Nautical terminology
Bridge components

de:Suprastruktur
id:Superstruktur
tr:Üstyapı